Rhombichthys intoccabilis is an extinct clupeomorph which existed in West Bank during the upper Cretaceous period.

The adults of R. intoccabilis had a very deep, scute-covered belly.  In conjunction with the high, triangular dorsal fin, the belly gives the fish a rhombus-shaped body profile, hence the generic name.  The juveniles, in contrast, had a far shallower belly, having a rounded profile.

References

Prehistoric ray-finned fish genera
Fossil taxa described in 2010
Late Cretaceous fish of Asia